Argyresthia laricella, the larch shoot moth, is a moth of the family Yponomeutidae. The species was first described by William D. Kearfott in 1908. It is found in Canada, including north-western Ontario, Nova Scotia, south-eastern Manitoba, Saskatchewan, western Alberta and southern British Columbia.

The wingspan is 11–12 mm. The forewings are nearly immaculate, very pale shining ochreous. The hindwings are whitish ochreous. Adults are on wing from the end of June to mid-July.

The larvae feed on Larix species (including L. decidua, L. kaempferi, L. laricina and L. occidentalis) and Picea glauca. Young larvae bore through the terminal twigs of their host plant, effectually killing the twigs and stopping further growth. In fall, they cut a circular exit hole at the base where pupation takes place.

References

Moths described in 1908
Argyresthia
Moths of North America